Jorge Juan may refer to:

Jorge Juan y Santacilia (1713–1773), Spanish mathematician, scientist, naval officer, and mariner
Spanish sloop Jorge Juan, a Spanish Navy sloop that fought in the Spanish–American War in 1898
Jorge Juan (baseball), baseball player